Daniel David Lee (born 1 March 1976) is a New Zealand former international rugby union player who played as a halfback, who currently works as a rugby coach.

Lee played for the Hurricanes, Chiefs, the Highlanders Super 14 and Hawke's Bay in the Air New Zealand Cup. In 2007 he joined the Blues in New Zealand.

In June 2009 Lee joined the Newport Gwent Dragons in Wales on a two-year contract. In November 2010, after a series of injuries, Lee announced his retirement from rugby having made just 12 appearances for Newport Gwent Dragons.

Lee played two test matches for the All Blacks in 2002.

Coaching career
After retiring from professional rugby, Lee became a rugby coach. He coached Hawke's Bay from 2011 to 2017, and then Mie Honda Heat until 2021. As of 2022, Lee currently coaches the San Diego Legion rugby team of Major League Rugby.

References

External links 
Newport Gwent Dragons profile
 Blues profile
 

1976 births
New Zealand international rugby union players
Living people
New Zealand rugby union players
New Zealand rugby union coaches
Highlanders (rugby union) players
Hurricanes (rugby union) players
Chiefs (rugby union) players
Blues (Super Rugby) players
Dragons RFC players
People educated at Hastings Boys' High School
Counties Manukau rugby union players
Hawke's Bay rugby union players
Otago rugby union players
New Zealand expatriate rugby union players
Expatriate rugby union players in Wales
New Zealand expatriate sportspeople in Wales
Rugby union players from Hastings, New Zealand
Rugby union scrum-halves